The National Meat Institute (Instituto Nacional de Carnes, INAC) is a governmental agency of Uruguay. Its headquarters are in Rincon Str. 545, Ciudad Vieja, Montevideo. Decree-Law No. 15,605 of July 27, 1984 created the agency.

References

External links

 National Meat Institute
 National Meat Institute 

Government of Uruguay
Meat industry organizations